Elin Kallio (23 April 1859 Helsinki, Finland –  25 December 1927, Helsinki) was a celebrated pioneering Finnish gymnast. She is considered the founder of the women’s gymnastic movement in Finland.

Kallio was educated at the Stockholm Royal Gymnastic Institute. She was a gymnastics instructor for thirty-four years at private Finnish girls schools and at the University of Helsinki. She founded the first Finnish association for female gymnasts in 1876 and this developed into the Federation of Finnish Women Gymnasts in 1896.

Kallio wrote extensively on the subject of gymnastics and women's physical education.

In 1959, a hundred years after her birth she was commemorated on a Finnish postal stamp.

References

Further reading

Famous Women on stamps Elin Kallio  Accessed February 2009
Elin Kallion Voimistelujärjestelmä − Suomalaisen Naisvoimistelun Perusta, Aino Sarje, 2008 . With English translation.

 "Naisvoimistelun käsikirja" ("Women's gymnastics Handbook."), 1901
 "Voimistelun käsikirja. Etupäässä naisseminaarien ja kansakoulujen tarpeeksi"   (Gymnastics Handbook. Mainly of seminars for women and people of school age), 1909
 "Komentoharjoituksia" ("Command Exercises"), 1924

1859 births
1927 deaths
Finnish female artistic gymnasts
Sportspeople from Helsinki